The Matra Sports V12 engine is an automotive internal combustion engine for sports car endurance racing and Formula One. It won the 24 Hours of Le Mans three times.

Characteristics 
The Matra Sports V12 is a four-stroke, water-cooled all-aluminum 60° double overhead camshaft V12 engine with a seven-main-bearing crankshaft.

History 

This engine was designed by engineer Georges Martin, who designed the Simca "Poissy engine". Martin joined Matra at the end of 1966 due to Philippe Guédon (who later became CEO of Matra), his former colleague at Simca without knowing what was expected of him. Jean-Luc Lagardère announced that it is responsible to design an engine for Formula One which has to develop 150 horsepower per litre.

Complete Formula One World Championship results
(key) (results in bold indicate pole position; results in italics indicate fastest lap)

Notes and references 

Formula One engines
V12 engines
Gasoline engines by model
Matra